Statistics of Primera Fuerza in season 1928-29.

Overview
It was contested by 9 teams, and Marte won the championship.

League standings

Moves
Aurrerá retired.

Top goalscorers
Players sorted first by goals scored, then by last name.

References
Mexico - List of final tables (RSSSF)

1928-29
Mex
1928–29 in Mexican football